Gileh Sara (also Romanized as Gīleh Sarā) is a village in Howmeh Rural District, in the Central District of Masal County, Gilan Province, Iran. At the 2006 census, its population was 683, in 173 families.

References 

Populated places in Masal County